Good Counsel may refer to: 

 Our Lady of Good Counsel High School (Montgomery County, Maryland), United States
 Good Counsel GAA, a Gaelic Athletic Association club in Dublin, Ireland
 Good Counsel Complex, in White Plains, New York, United States

See also 
 Good Counsel College (disambiguation)
 Our Lady of Good Counsel Church (disambiguation)